Jinling College, Nanjing University is a college of Nanjing University in Nanjing, China. It is a young institution in Nanjing University, founded in 1998 by Nanjing University and located on its Pukou Campus. It was originally set for the cultivating first-class inter-disciplinary talents who have innovation spirits and are capable of solving problems in industry. By adopting new educational scheme as an exploration to education, this college is growing up to a prestigious institution. 

Since 2022, Jinling College is restructured as the new part of Suzhou Campus of Nanjing University and set out its new journey undertaking its new missions to nurture top talents in digital industries. 

Universities and colleges in Nanjing
Nanjing University